The 2018 New Hampshire Senate election was held on November 6, 2018, concurrently with the elections for the New Hampshire House of Representatives, to elect members to the 166th New Hampshire General Court. All 24 seats in the New Hampshire Senate were up for election. It resulted in Democrats gaining control of both chambers of the New Hampshire General Court, ending the total control of New Hampshire's state government, that Republicans had held in New Hampshire since the 2016 state elections.

Primary elections were held on September 11, 2018.

Background 

In the 2016 New Hampshire state elections, Republicans held on to their majority in the New Hampshire Senate by a margin of 14–10. Republicans also maintained control of the New Hampshire House of Representatives. In addition, Republican Chris Sununu won the open 2016 New Hampshire gubernatorial election giving the New Hampshire Republican Party total control of the state government for the first time since Republican Governor Craig Benson was defeated by Democrat John Lynch in the 2004 New Hampshire gubernatorial election.

In the aftermath of his 2016 election, then president-elect Donald Trump claimed in a tweet that voter fraud had occurred in New Hampshire. In February 2017, Trump advisor Stephen Miller reaffirmed that position by claiming "busing voters in to New Hampshire is widely known by anyone who’s worked in New Hampshire politics". These claims were called "baseless" by several observers.

In response to those allegations, the Republican majorities in the New Hampshire General Court drafted bills changing voter registration rules. Senate Bill 3 (SB 3) passed both chambers of the New Hampshire General Court on party-line votes and was signed in to law by Governor Sununu on July 10, 2017. The new law requires voters to declare a "domicile" in New Hampshire. It also included jail sentences of up to one year or a fine of up to $5,000, if voters registered and not provided necessary paperwork as proof within 10 day or 30 days in smaller towns.  Republicans pointed to over 5,000 voters who voted in the 2016 election after identifying with an out-of-state driver's licence, that have not gotten an in-state licence as of September 2017. Democrats suspected a voter suppression scheme, that targeted college students, that they think are most likely to use identification issued by other states.

The League of Women Voters, the New Hampshire Democratic Party and several college students challenged the new law in court. They pointed to the Supreme Court's decision in Symm v. United States, that guaranteed college students the right to vote at their university. The trial judge of the Hillsborough Superior Court decided on October 22, 2018, that the state cannot apply the law in the upcoming elections. The Attorney General of New Hampshire's office then filed an emergency motion with the New Hampshire Supreme Court. The State Supreme Court sided with the state in a unanimous 5-0 decision arguing that overturning the law so close to elections was potentially confusing and disruptive. The State Supreme Court did not decide on the merits of the law in this decision. Therefore, SB3 was first applied in the 2018 elections.

Results

Analysis 
In the 2018 elections, Democrats saw gains in state elections across the countries, gaining multiple Governorships and legislative chambers. Democrats also won control of the United States House of Representatives for the first time since 2010. Commentators called the election results a "blue wave", that was especially pronounced in state elections.

In the New Hampshire Senate, Democrats were able to flip Districts 9, 11, 12, 23 and 24, while the Republicans flipped District 1. The Democratic gains were mostly in less rural areas in Southern and Eastern New Hampshire while the Republican gains were limited to the rural Senate District 1 in the North Country. The incumbent Democratic Senator in District 1, Jeff Woodburn, had been accused of domestic violence and criminally charged a few months before the election.

Overview 

Source: Official results.

Detailed results

District 1
Incumbent Democratic State Senator Jeff Woodburn had represented the New Hampshire's 1st State Senate District since 2012. Senator Woodburn had also served as Senate Minority Leader since 2014. Woodburn was arrested on August 2, 2018 on simple assault, domestic violence, criminal mischief, and criminal trespass charges. Democratic Party Chairman Raymond Buckley called on him to resign. On August 6, Woodburn announced he would resign as the minority leader but would remain as a senator.  He won the Democratic primary on September 11, 2018, but was defeated by Republican David Starr in the 2018 general election.

District 2
Incumbent Republican State Senator Bob Giuda had represented the New Hampshire's 2nd State Senate District since 2016. He won reelection against Democrat Bill Bolton.

District 3 
Incumbent Republican State Senator Jeb Bradley had represented the New Hampshire's 3rd State Senate District since 2009. He won reelection against Democrat Christopher Meier and Libertarian Tania Butler.

District 4 
Incumbent Democrat State Senator David Watters had represented the New Hampshire's 4th State Senate District since 2012. He was reelected without opposition.

District 5 
Incumbent Democratic State Senator Martha Hennessey had represented the New Hampshire's 5th State Senate District since 2016. She won reelection against Republican Patrick Lozito.

District 6 
Incumbent Republican State Senator James Gray had represented the New Hampshire's 6th State Senate District since 2016. He won reelection against Democrat Anne Grassie.

District 7 
Incumbent Republican State Senator Harold F. French had represented the New Hampshire's 7th State Senate District since 2016. He won reelection against Democrat Mason Donovan.

District 8 
Incumbent Republican State Senator Ruth Ward had represented the New Hampshire's 8th State Senate District since 2016. She won reelection against Democrat Jenn Alford-Teaster.

District 9 
Incumbent Republican State Senator Andy Sanborn had represented the New Hampshire's 9th State Senate District since 2010. He did not run for reelection in 2018. Instead, he ran unsuccessfully in the Republican primary for New Hampshire's 1st congressional district. The open seat was won by Democrat Jeanne Dietsch against Republican Dan Hynes.

District 10 
Incumbent Democratic State Senator Jay Kahn had represented the New Hampshire's 10th State Senate District since 2016. He won reelection against Republican Dan LeClair and Libertarian Ian Freeman.

District 11 
Incumbent Republican State Senator Gary L. Daniels had represented the New Hampshire's 11th State Senate District since 2014. He was defeated for reelection by Democratic State Representative Shannon Chandley.

District 12 
Incumbent Republican State Senator Kevin Avard had represented the New Hampshire's 12th State Senate District since 2014. He was defeated for reelection by former Democratic State Representative Melanie Levesque.

District 13 
Incumbent Democratic State Senator Bette Lasky had represented the New Hampshire's 13th State Senate District since 2012. She did not run for reelection in 2018. The open seat was won by Democrat Cindy Rosenwald against Republican David Schoneman.

District 14 
Incumbent Republican State Senator Sharon Carson had represented the New Hampshire's 14th State Senate District since 2008. She won reelection against Democrat Tammy Siekmann.

District 15 
Incumbent Democratic State Senator Dan Feltes had represented the New Hampshire's 15th State Senate District since 2014. He won reelection against Republican Pamela Ean.

District 16 
Incumbent Democratic State Senator Kevin Cavanaugh had represented the New Hampshire's 16th State Senate District since a 2017 special election. He won reelection in a rematch against former Republican State Senator David Boutin.

District 17 
Incumbent Republican State Senator John Reagan had represented the New Hampshire's 17th State Senate District since 2012. He won reelection against Democrat Christoper Roundy.

District 18 
Incumbent Democratic State Senator Donna Soucy had represented the New Hampshire's 18th State Senate District since 2012. She won reelection against Republican State Representative George Lambert.

District 19 
Incumbent Republican State Senator Regina Birdsell had represented the New Hampshire's 19th State Senate District since 2014. She won reelection against Democrat Kristina Durocher.

District 20 
Incumbent Democratic State Senator Lou D'Allesandro had represented the New Hampshire's 20th State Senate District since 1998. D'Allesandro is the longest-serving member of the body. He won reelection against Republican Carla Gericke.

District 21 
Incumbent Democratic State Senator Martha Fuller Clark had represented the New Hampshire's 21st State Senate District since 2012. She won reelection against Republican Peter Macdonald.

District 22 
Incumbent Republican State Senator Chuck Morse had represented the New Hampshire's 22nd State Senate District since 2010. He won reelection against Democrat Richard O'Shaughnessy and Libertarian Mitch Dyer.

District 23 
Incumbent Republican State Senator Bill Gannon had represented the New Hampshire's 23rd State Senate District since 2014. He was defeated for reelection by Democrat Jon Morgan.

District 24 
Incumbent Republican State Senator Daniel Innis had represented the New Hampshire's 24th State Senate District since 2016. He was defeated for reelection by Democratic State Representative Tom Sherman.

References

New Hampshire Senate elections
Senate
New Hampshire